Hodotermopsis is a genus of termites. It is the only genus in the family Hodotermopsidae, which was elevated from the subfamily Hodotermopsinae in 2022. It contains a single extant species, H. sjostedti, and the fossil species H. iwatensis (Fujiyama, 1983). Hodotermopsidae together with Stolotermitidae, Hodotermitidae, and Archotermopsidae, form the monophyletic clade Teletisoptera under Euisoptera which is confirmed to be a sister group to Mastotermitidae.

References 

Termites
Monogeneric insect families